Zhou Guangzhao  (born May 15, 1929) is a Chinese theoretical physicist who served as President of the Chinese Academy of Sciences from 1987 to 1997.

Early life and education
Zhou Guangzhao was born on May 15, 1929 in Changsha, the capital of Hunan province. He was the 5th child of the civil engineer Zhou Fengjiu, and the younger brother of biochemist/geneticist Zhou Guangyu. He graduated from Tsinghua University in 1951, and then did graduate work in theoretical physics for three years at Beijing University. He stayed at Beijing Univ. on the faculty after completing his PhD. In 1957 he was sent to the USSR by the Chinese Atomic Energy Research Institute to work at the Dubna Joint Institute for Nuclear Research.

Professional career
Zhou returned to China in 1960, where he worked on the Chinese nuclear weapons program, ultimately becoming director of the Chinese Nuclear Weapons Research Institute. He was elected to the Chinese Academy of Sciences (CAS) and later became the Vice President (1984–1987) and President (1987–1997) of the CAS.

Zhou's theoretical work focuses on particle physics. 

He first visited the US in 1979. In the 1980s he spent time as a visiting researcher at the University of California and Virginia Polytechnic Institute and at the European Organization for Nuclear Research in Switzerland.

Honors
The asteroid 3462 Zhouguangzhao is named after him.

Dr. Zhou was elected to the US National Academy of Sciences in 1987.

References

External links
US National Academy of Sciences Entry
entry at chinavitae.com

1929 births
Living people
Chinese nuclear physicists
Educators from Hunan
Chongqing Nankai Secondary School alumni
Tsinghua University alumni
Peking University alumni
Members of the Chinese Academy of Sciences
Foreign associates of the National Academy of Sciences
Foreign Members of the USSR Academy of Sciences
Foreign Members of the Russian Academy of Sciences
Foreign Members of the Royal Society
People from Ningxiang
Physicists from Hunan
Academic staff of the University of Science and Technology of China
Vice Chairpersons of the National People's Congress